United States v. Dougherty, 473 F.2d 1113 (D.C. Cir. 1972) was a 1972 decision by the United States Court of Appeals for the District of Columbia in which the court ruled that members of the D.C. Nine, who had broken into Dow Chemical Company, vandalized office furniture and equipment, and spilled about a bloodlike substance, were not entitled to a new trial on the basis of the judge's failing to allow a jury nullification jury instruction. The Appeals Court ruled, by a 2–1 vote:

Nonetheless, the defendants were given a new trial on the grounds that they had been denied their right of self-representation. The Circuit Judges' assumption that jurors know about their nullification prerogative has since been brought into question by other empirical evidence. According to Irwin Horowitz, "Beyond the empirical issue, lack of nullification instructions maintains a deceit. After all, juries can nullify, but they know this fact only on a sotto voce level."

References

External links

1972 in United States case law
Jury nullification
United States Court of Appeals for the District of Columbia Circuit cases